Homer v Chief Constable of West Yorkshire Police [2012] UKSC 15 is a UK labour law case, concerning discrimination under what is now the Equality Act 2010.

Facts
Mr Homer claimed indirect age discrimination, because after a rule change he was required to have a law degree to get onto the third and highest pay grade, once he was 62 years old. He began working as a legal adviser in 1995 with the Police National Legal Database. He was required to have a law degree or in his case ‘exceptional experience in criminal law with a lesser qualification’. But to get the highest pay grade after a 2005 review, legal advisers now actually had to have a law degree, and so he was refused entry.

He brought a claim under the Employment Equality (Age) Regulations 2006, SI 2006/1031 after internal grievances and appeals were dismissed. The Employment Tribunal allowed Mr Homer’s claim.

In the Employment Appeal Tribunal, Elias P, [2009] overturning the Tribunal, held that there was no basis for thinking there was any particular disadvantage for those aged between 60 and 65, because it was not intrinsically more difficult for people in that category to get a degree. The financial consequences resulted merely from age, not age discrimination.

The Court of Appeal [2010]  agreed with the Employment Appeal Tribunal, arguing that it was not Mr Homer’s age that put him at a particular disadvantage but his impending retirement, the same as any employee nearing retirement in four years.

The Supreme Court  allowed his appeal and determined that the case must be remitted back to the Employment Tribunal for further consideration. The Supreme Court determined that the new education requirement discriminated on the basis of age.

Judgment
Lady Hale (with whom Lord Brown and Lord Kerr agreed) held that Mr Homer had suffered indirect age discrimination. Mr Homer’s near retirement was directly related to his age. The question would be remitted to the Tribunal to decide whether there was a justification for indirect discrimination.

Lord Hope, in a short concurring judgment, expressed the view that discrimination is not justified just because eliminating it would put others at a disadvantage that was not related to their age.

Lord Mance also gave a short concurring judgment, although pointing out that to allow Mr Homer to go to the third pay grade without a law degree could be discriminatory against young people.

Follow on
In Games v University of Kent [2014] UKEAT 0524/13/1407, the tribunal examined Homer and the argument that the candidate was not discriminated against due to an education requirement. The tribunal then expounded on the time at which a test is applied is the time at which the capabilities of the claimant are to be assessed. The argument that the claimant could have gone to school in the past is not a valid defence. 
https://www.gov.uk/employment-appeal-tribunal-decisions/mr-stephen-games-v-university-of-kent-ukeat-0524-13-da

See also

UK labour law
European Union law

Notes

References

United Kingdom labour case law